Luya Viejo is a district of the Luya Province, Peru, located in the northern part of the province. The capital is the town Luya Viejo.

The district covers an area of 73.87 km²; the district capital is located at an altitude of 2,820 m above sea level. The climate is dry moderate cold.

The District of Luya borders:

To the North: Conila District, Santa Catalina District.
To the South: Luya District, Lonya Chico District.
To the East: St Kitts of Olto District, Santa Catalina District.
To the West: Conila District.

The district has several attractive places for tourists, such as the ruins of the Chachapoya culture.

External links
Luya Viejo district official website 

Districts of the Luya Province
Districts of the Amazonas Region